Cirilo Antonio Mora Ortíz (born 15 November 1988) is a Paraguayan footballer who plays for Tacuary Team as overage player.

Mora started his career at the capital club Tacuary and in July 2009 moved to Vicenza. Both players holds EU nationality and could be joined the Serie B club directly. (signing non-EU play abroad is restricted)

He capped for Paraguay national Under-17 football team at 2005 South American Under-17 Football Championship. He appeared at 2004 South American Under-15 Football Championship.

References

External links
Soccerway Profile
 Vivenza Profile
 Tacuary Profile
 

Paraguayan footballers
Paraguayan expatriate footballers
Paraguayan expatriate sportspeople in Italy
Club Tacuary footballers
L.R. Vicenza players
Club Olimpia (Itá) players
Association football midfielders
Expatriate footballers in Argentina
Expatriate footballers in Italy
People from Central Department
1988 births
Living people